The Qingdao–Jinan passenger railway, or Jiaoji passenger railway, is a high-speed railway operated by China Railway Jinan Group in Shandong province, running from Jinan to Qingdao at  following the Qingdao–Jinan Railway. "" in its short name is a reference to the Jiaozhou Bay region, where Qingdao is located; "" refers to Jinan. The line opened in 2008, with the goal to further separate passenger and freight services on the congested Qingdao–Jinan Railway and provide extra capacity.

Connecting at Jinan with the Beijing–Shanghai high-speed railway, the Qingdao–Jinan line offers direct high-speed (G- and D-series) train service from Qingdao to both Beijing South and Shanghai.

See also
 Qingdao–Jinan Railway – the older "conventional" railway running along the Jiaoji passenger railway
 Qingdao–Jinan high-speed railway – a faster parallel high-speed railway

References 

High-speed railway lines in China
Railway lines opened in 2008
Rail transport in Shandong
Standard gauge railways in China